Metamesia is a genus of moths belonging to the subfamily Tortricinae of the family Tortricidae.

Species
Metamesia ametria Diakonoff, 1960
Metamesia catadryas (Meyrick, 1937)
Metamesia designata (Meyrick, 1921)
Metamesia dilucida Diakonoff, 1960
Metamesia elegans (Walsingham, 1881)
Metamesia endopyrrha (Meyrick, 1930)
Metamesia episema Diakonoff, 1960
Metamesia incepta (Meyrick, 1912)
Metamesia intensa (Meyrick, 1921)
Metamesia leptodelta Diakonoff, 1973
Metamesia leucomitra Diakonoff, 1960
Metamesia leucophyes Diakonoff, 1960
Metamesia metacroca Diakonoff, 1960
Metamesia nolens Diakonoff, 1960
Metamesia peracuta Diakonoff, 1960
Metamesia physetopa (Meyrick, 1932)
Metamesia ptychophora Diakonoff, 1960
Metamesia retrocitra Diakonoff, 1960
Metamesia synclysa Diakonoff, 1973

Former species
Metamesia octogona Bradley, 1965

See also
List of Tortricidae genera

References

 , 2005: World catalogue of insects volume 5 Tortricidae.
 , 2010: Tortricidae (Lepidoptera) from Ethiopia Journal of Entomological and Acarological Research Serie II 42 (2): 47–79. Abstract: .

External links
tortricidae.com

Archipini
Tortricidae genera